Soana may refer to
Sovana, a town in Tuscany
Soana (stream) a torrent in Piedmont, Italy